Luigi Bazzoni (25 June 1929 – 1 March 2012) was an Italian director and screenwriter.

Born in Salsomaggiore Terme, Italy, Bazzoni was the elder brother of the film director and cinematographer Camillo Bazzoni and a cousin of the Academy Award winner Vittorio Storaro.

He began his career as assistant director of Mauro Bolognini. Later he became director of films and short films, gaining critical attention for two Spaghetti Westerns, Man, Pride and Vengeance and Brothers Blue. His short film Di Domenica achieved a Special Mention at the 1963 Cannes Film Festival.

Filmography 
 The Possessed (La donna del lago/ The Lady of the Lake) (1965)
 Man, Pride and Vengeance (L'Uomo, l'orgoglio, la vendetta) (1968)
 The Fifth Cord (Giornata nera per l'ariete) (1971)
 Brothers Blue (Blu Gang - Vissero per sempre felici e ammazzati) (1973)
 Footprints on the Moon (Le Orme) (1975)

References

External links 
 

Italian film directors
Giallo film directors
Spaghetti Western directors
1929 births
People from Salsomaggiore Terme
2012 deaths